Wilhelm Theodor Albers (May 22, 1840, in Bavaria – January 21, 1904, in Sheboygan County, Wisconsin), was a member of the Wisconsin State Assembly. In 1859, he moved to St. Louis, Missouri. During the American Civil War, he served with the 12th Iowa Volunteer Infantry Regiment of the Union Army, achieving the rank of captain. Albers later moved to Centerville, Manitowoc County, Wisconsin. From 1875 to 1882 he was a school principal in Hika, Wisconsin. He died on January 21, 1904, in Sheboygan County, Wisconsin.

Political career
Albers was a member of the Assembly in 1883. Other positions he held include town clerk of Centerville. He was a Democrat.

References

Politicians from St. Louis
People from Centerville, Manitowoc County, Wisconsin
City and town clerks
People of Iowa in the American Civil War
Union Army officers
Schoolteachers from Wisconsin
1840 births
Bavarian emigrants to the United States
1904 deaths
19th-century American politicians
19th-century American educators
Military personnel from Wisconsin
Democratic Party members of the Wisconsin State Assembly